William Traval is an Australian actor, known for his work as Dr. Jack Quade on the Australian hospital drama All Saints (2004–2008), and as Will Simpson on the Netflix superhero drama series Jessica Jones (2015–2018).

Early life
Traval was born on a strawberry farm near Colac in Victoria, Australia, and is of part Russian descent. He graduated from high school at the age of 16. His passion for acting began in high school when he and his friends spent their time making short films. He cast himself in many roles including a werewolf and a psychopath. Traval studied Media and Literature at La Trobe University, but later he decided he would prefer to study at the National Institute of Dramatic Art (NIDA).

Personal life 
Traval married Terasa Livingstone in 2014.

On 17 June 2020, Traval publicly came out as pansexual on his Instagram account.

Filmography

Film

Television

References

External links

 

1980 births
21st-century Australian male actors
Australian male film actors
Australian male soap opera actors
Australian people of Russian descent
Living people
Male actors from Victoria (Australia)
People from Colac, Victoria
Australian LGBT actors
Bisexual male actors
Bisexual men